El Molino High School was a public four-year comprehensive high school located at 7050 Covey Road in Forestville, California, United States.

El Molino High School serves the West Sonoma County Union High School District. Matt Dunkle is the principal. Its campus occupies  of land.

The high school offers advanced placement classes (AP) in a number of subjects. The advanced placement participation rate of students at El Molino is 23%. The pass rate for AP exams is 78%.

The student demographics at El Molino are 48% male and 52% female. The total minority student enrollment is 30 percent with hispanic students, who make up the largest minority group, accounting for 23% of the school's total population.

Awards
El Molino has been named a California Distinguished School five times: in 1988, 1992, 2001, 2009, and 2015.

Notable alumni
  
 Ben McKee (class of 2003) Bass player and cofounder of Imagine Dragons.
 Jason Lane (Class of 1995), Former Major League Baseball outfielder and now coach for the Milwaukee Brewers.
 Arianne Phillips (Class of 1980), Hollywood costume designer and 3-time Academy Award nominee (IMDb)
 Max Thieriot (Class of 2006), actor
Morgan Spector (Class of 1997), film and theatre actor

See also

 List of school districts in Sonoma County, California

References

External links
 
 El Molino baseball at MaxPreps

High schools in Sonoma County, California
Public high schools in California